Thomas Hakon Grönwall or Thomas Hakon Gronwall (January 16, 1877 in Dylta bruk, Sweden – May 9, 1932 in New York City, New York) was a Swedish mathematician. He studied at the University College of Stockholm and Uppsala University and completed his Ph.D. at Uppsala in 1898.  Grönwall worked for about a year as a civil engineer in Germany before he emigrated to the United States in 1904.  He later taught mathematics at Princeton University and from 1925 he was a member of the physics department at Columbia University.

In 1925 he started to collaborate with Victor LaMer, which led to his joining the Department of Physics at Columbia University as an associate in 1927. This connection was a great opportunity. There were no teaching obligations; he had complete control of his own time and an abundance of new intriguing problems to address in physical chemistry and in atomic physics. He developed a solution to higher approximation in the Debye–Hückel theory.

See also
Grönwall's area theorem
Grönwall's inequality
Grönwall's theorem

References

External links

 

1877 births
1932 deaths
Uppsala University alumni
Stockholm University alumni
20th-century Swedish  mathematicians
Columbia University faculty
Swedish emigrants to the United States